Three ships in the United States Navy have been named USS Stockton for Commodore Robert F. Stockton.

  was a torpedo boat, commissioned in 1901 and decommissioned in 1913.
  was a  commissioned in 1917, served in World War I, decommissioned in 1922, and transferred to the Royal Navy as HMS Ludlow in 1940.

Others:
 The name Stockton was assigned to DD-504, but the contract was cancelled and replaced by a contract for Stockton (DD-646).

United States Navy ship names